The following radio stations broadcast on FM frequency 106.5 MHz:

Argentina
 El Signo in Rosario, Santa Fe
 LRM437 del Rey in Reconquista, Santa Fe
 LRM700 Sytlo in Gobernador Crespo, Santa Fe
 Radio María in Juan José Castelli, Chaco

Australia
 3MRR in Wodonga, Victoria
 4ISA in Mount Isa, Queensland
 Hit Western Australia in Albany, Western Australia
 2WFM in Sydney, New South Wales
 Ultra106five in Hobart, Tasmania

Canada (Channel 293)
 CBHM-FM in Middleton, Nova Scotia
 CBOB-FM in Brockville, Ontario
 CBYV-FM in Vernon, British Columbia
 CFEI-FM in St-Hyacinthe, Quebec
 CFPT-FM in Toronto, Ontario
 CHBV-FM in Houston, British Columbia
 CHBY-FM in Barry's Bay, Ontario
 CHMN-FM in Canmore, Alberta
 CHMN-FM-1 in Banff, Alberta
 CIFN-FM in Island Lake, Saskatchewan
 CIRO-FM in Osoyoos, British Columbia
 CIXK-FM in Owen Sound, Ontario
 CJJJ-FM in Brandon, Manitoba
 CKAV-FM in Toronto, Ontario (off the air)
 VF2497 in Cranbrook, British Columbia
 VF2555 in Dawson Creek, British Columbia
 VF6010 in Prince George, British Columbia
 VF8022 in Crabtree, Quebec

China 
 CNR China Traffic Radio in Taiyuan
 CNR Music Radio in Yanji

Indonesia
 Sing FM in Batam & Singapore

Malaysia
 Melody in Kedah, Perlis & Penang

Mexico
 XHDFM-FM in Mexico City
 XHGV-FM in Querétaro, Querétaro
 XHIG-FM in Iguala, Guerrero
 XHLK-FM in Zacatecas, Zacatecas
 XHSCCK-FM in Salina Cruz, Oaxaca
 XHSCJB-FM in Tepakán, Calkiní Municipality, Campeche
 XHXP-FM in San Juan Bautista Tuxtepec, Oaxaca
 XHZCN-FM in Saltillo, Coahuila
 XHZUL-FM in Cerro Azul, Veracruz

United Kingdom
WK-END - Pirate Radio in London

Turkey
TRT Radyo Haber in Karaman

United States (Channel 293)
 KAHS-LP in Aberdeen, Washington
 KAJZ in Granite Shoals, Texas
 KALT-FM in Alturas, California
 KAVI-LP in La Junta, Colorado
 KBVA in Bella Vista, Arkansas
 KCQQ in Davenport, Iowa
 KEAL in Taft, California
 KEGT in San Miguel, California
 KEGX in Richland, Washington
 KELD-FM in Hampton, Arkansas
 KEND in Roswell, New Mexico
 KESW-LP in Whitehall, Montana
 KEZR in San Jose, California
 KFMC-FM in Fairmont, Minnesota
 KGIH-LP in Abilene, Kansas
 KITC-LP in Gilchrist, Oregon
 KITT in Meridian, Texas
 KIXA in Lucerne Valley, California
 KKIK in Horseshoe Bend, Arkansas
 KKMR in Arizona City, Arizona
 KLDU-LP in Laredo, Texas
 KLFN in Sunburg, Minnesota
 KLNQ in Atlanta, Louisiana
 KLNV in San Diego, California
 KMCX-FM in Ogallala, Nebraska
 KMKP-LP in Holdrege, Nebraska
 KMMT in Mammoth Lakes, California
 KNMF in Springer, New Mexico
 KOOI in Jacksonville, Texas
 KOVE-FM in Galveston, Texas
 KPEP in Eldorado, Texas
 KQWZ-LP in Seatac, Washington
 KQXL-FM in New Roads, Louisiana
 KRJB in Ada, Minnesota
 KRYL in Haiku, Hawaii
 KSEJ-LP in Victoria, Texas
 KSNE-FM in Las Vegas, Nevada
 KSPO in Dishman, Washington
 KTLS-FM in Holdenville, Oklahoma
 KTMO (FM) in New Madrid, Missouri
 KUDL in Sacramento, California
 KUOM-FM in Saint Louis Park, Minnesota
 KVVC-LP in Vallejo, California
 KWFG-FM in Knox City, Texas
 KWHL in Anchorage, Alaska
 KWPZ in Lynden, Washington
 KYRK in Taft, Texas
 KXTQ-FM in Lubbock, Texas
 KXZX-LP in Juilliard, Texas
 KYPX in Helena Valley SE, Montana
 KYQQ in Arkansas City, Kansas
 WAGE-LP in Oak Hill, West Virginia
 WAID in Clarksdale, Mississippi
 WARH in Granite City, Illinois
 WAVH in Daphne, Alabama
 WBMW in Pawcatuck, Connecticut
 WBTJ in Richmond, Virginia
 WCFT-FM in Bloomsburg, Pennsylvania
 WCJX in Five Points, Florida
 WDAF-FM in Liberty, Missouri
 WDSN in Reynoldsville, Pennsylvania
 WEND in Salisbury, North Carolina
 WFHC-LP in Hendersonville, North Carolina
 WFMP-LP in Louisville, Kentucky
 WHBZ in Sheboygan Falls, Wisconsin
 WHII-LP in Warminster, Pennsylvania
 WHLK in Cleveland, Ohio
 WJDT in Rogersville, Tennessee
 WJEC (FM) in Vernon, Alabama
 WJVA-LP in Portsmouth, Virginia
 WKCH in Whitewater, Wisconsin
 WKDZ-FM in Cadiz, Kentucky
 WKKM-LP in Harrison, Michigan
 WKRH in Fair Haven, New York
 WLFF in Georgetown, South Carolina
 WLVS-FM in Clifton, Tennessee
 WMCD in Rocky Ford, Georgia
 WMEF in Fort Kent, Maine
 WNHI in Farmington, New Hampshire
 WNIK-FM in Arecibo, Puerto Rico
 WOYS in Carrabelle, Florida
 WPPM-LP in Philadelphia, Pennsylvania
 WPYX in Albany, New York
 WQCB in Brewer, Maine
 WQLX in Chillicothe, Ohio
 WRBG-LP in Millsboro, Delaware
 WRDY-LP in Eagleville, Pennsylvania
 WRLV-FM in Salyersville, Kentucky
 WRUB in Sarasota, Florida
 WSFL-FM in New Bern, North Carolina
 WSKZ in Chattanooga, Tennessee
 WTHJ in Bass River Township, New Jersey
 WTKD in Greenville, Ohio
 WTOD in Delta, Ohio
 WVFM in Kalamazoo, Michigan
 WWBL in Washington, Indiana
 WWLW in Clarksburg, West Virginia
 WWMX in Baltimore, Maryland
 WXMP-LP in Cordova, Tennessee
 WXNU in Saint Anne, Illinois
 WXXJ (FM) in Ponte Vedra Beach, Florida
 WYRK in Buffalo, New York
 WYTE in Marshfield, Wisconsin
 WZIQ in Smithville, Georgia
 WZNJ in Demopolis, Alabama

References

Lists of radio stations by frequency